Theroa is a genus of moths of the family Notodontidae erected by William Schaus in 1901.

Species
Theroa zethus (Druce, 1898)
Theroa amathynta (Dyar, 1918)

References

Notodontidae